Maracaibo Province was a province of the 1824 created Zulia Department of Gran Colombia. The capital was Maracaibo. 

The Zulia Department was a successor of the Maracaibo Province (Spanish Empire).

1830 it became Maracaibo Province (Venezuela).

Cantons 
 Maracaibo 
 Gibraltar
 Altagracia
 Zulia cabecera San Carlos de Zulia
 Perijá cabecera Rosario de Perijá

See also 
 Maracaibo Province (Spanish Empire)
 Maracaibo Province (Venezuela)

Provinces of Gran Colombia
1824 establishments in Gran Colombia